Perm State Choreographic College (commonly known as the Perm Ballet School) is an internationally renowned, professional ballet school, based in Perm, Russia. It is the associate school of the Perm Opera and Ballet Theatre.

History
The origins of the school lie in the 1941 Siege of Leningrad, during which the ballet and opera companies of the then Kirov Theatre were evacuated to Perm (then known as Molotov), along with the Leningrad Choreographic School. The ballet school remained in the city until the blockade of Leningrad was lifted in 1944 and plans were immediately put forward for a permanent ballet and opera theatre in Perm. The ballet school was officially opened on April 2, 1945 and has remained on the same site throughout its history, with student performances being staged at the Perm Academic Theatre since 1984.

References

1941 establishments in the Soviet Union